The Puerto Rico Department of Family Affairs is responsible for all matters related to the sociology of the family and social work in the U.S. Commonwealth of Puerto Rico.

Agencies
 style="margin: 0 auto"
! scope=col style="text-align: left" | Name in English
! scope=col style="text-align: left" | Name in Spanish
! scope=col style="text-align: left" | Abbreviation in Spanish
|-
| Administration for Child Care and the Integrated Development of Childhood
| Administración para el Cuidado y Desarrollo Integral de la Niñez
| ACUDEN
|-
| Administration for Child Support
| Administración para el Sustento de Menores
| ASUME
|-
| Administration for Families and Children
| Administración de Familias y Niños
| ADFAN
|-
| Administration for the Socioeconomic Development of the Family
| Administración para el Desarrollo Socioeconómico de la Familia
| ADSEF
|-
| Corporation for Industries for the Blind, Mentally Retarded People, and Other Handicapped People
| Corporación para las Industrias de Ciegos, Personas Mentalmente Retardadas y Otras Personas Incapacitadas
| CIRIO
|-

Secretaries

The Puerto Rico Secretary of Family Affairs leads the Puerto Rico Department of Family Affairs and all efforts related to the sociology of the family and social work in the island.

References

Executive departments of the government of Puerto Rico